Amra Sadiković was the defending champion, but chose not to participate.

Eugenie Bouchard won the all-Canadian final 6–1, 6–2 over Sharon Fichman.

Seeds

Main draw

Finals

Top half

Bottom half

References 
 Main draw
 Qualifying draw

Tevlin Women's Challenger
Tevlin Women's Challenger